Yotsuba may refer to:
 Yotsuba&!, a Japanese manga by Kiyohiko Azuma
 Yotsuba Koiwai, the title character from Yotsuba&!
 Yotsuba, a character from the manga and anime Sister Princess
 Yotsuba Nakano, a character from the manga and anime The Quintessential Quintuplets
 Yotsuba Group, the name of a group in the Japanese manga and anime Death Note